Øvre Rindal Chapel is a parish church of the Church of Norway in Rindal Municipality in Trøndelag county, Norway. It is located in the village of Tiset. It is one of the churches for the Rindal parish which is part of the Orkdal prosti (deanery) in the Diocese of Nidaros. The white, wooden church was built in a long church style in 1911 by the architect Lars Anderson Mogstad. The church seats about 210 people.

History
A royal resolution from 22 May 1909 granted permission to erect an annex chapel for Rindal Church in the upper Rindal valley. Drawings were prepared by Lars Andersen Mogstad who used Herman Backer's drawings for Landsmarka Chapel in Nome in Telemark. The new chapel was consecrated on 29 July 1911. The chapel was enlarged in 1986 and again in 1990 and was made a full parish church rather than its original "chapel" status. 

Historically, the parish of Rindal was part of the Indre Nordmøre prosti (deanery) in the Diocese of Møre. On 1 January 2020, the parish of Rindal was transferred to the Orkdal prosti (deanery) in the Diocese of Nidaros. This transfer is a result of the municipality of Rindal being transferred from Møre og Romsdal county to Trøndelag county on 1 January 2019.

Media gallery

See also
List of churches in Nidaros

References

Rindal
Churches in Trøndelag
Long churches in Norway
Wooden churches in Norway
20th-century Church of Norway church buildings
Churches completed in 1911
1911 establishments in Norway